Idaho is a novel written by Emily Ruskovich and published by Random House on January 3, 2017. The author received the International Dublin Literary Award and the book was nominated for the International Dublin Literary Award by Bibliotheek Brugge Library.

Reviews 
The book has been reviewed by The New York Times and The Guardian.

References 

2017 American novels
American mystery novels
Novels set in Idaho
Random House books
2017 debut novels